Lisa Westcott is a British make-up artist. Before winning an Oscar for her work in the successful film Les Misérables (2012), she earned two consecutive nominations for Mrs Brown (1997) and Shakespeare in Love (1998). Her other accolades include two BAFTA Awards.

Oscars
All of these were in the category of for Best Makeup

70th Academy Awards-Nominated for Mrs Brown. Shared nomination with Beverley Binda and Veronica Brebner. Lost to Men in Black.
71st Academy Awards-Nominated for Shakespeare in Love. Nomination shared with Veronica Brebner. Lost to Elizabeth.
85th Academy Awards-Les Misérables. Shared with Julie Dartnell. Won.

Selected filmography
Les Misérables (2012)
Captain America: The First Avenger (2011)
The Wolfman (2010)
Miss Potter (2006)
From Hell (2001)
Shakespeare in Love (1998)
Mrs Brown (1997)

References

External links

Best Makeup Academy Award winners
Best Makeup BAFTA Award winners
Living people
Year of birth missing (living people)
Place of birth missing (living people)
British make-up artists